Kobulov is a masculine surname, its feminine counterpart is Kobulova. Notable people with the surname include:

 Amayak Kobulov (1906–1955), Soviet politician
 Bogdan Kobulov (1904–1953), Soviet politician, brother of Amayak

See also
 Kabulov